The Plattenhörner is a 3220 meter-high multi-summited mountain in the Swiss Silvretta Alps, overlooking the Vereina Pass in the Swiss canton of Graubünden. The main summit has an elevation of 3,220 metres above sea level and is located three kilometres west of Piz Linard.

References

External links
 Plattenhörner on Hikr

Mountains of the Alps
Alpine three-thousanders
Mountains of Switzerland
Mountains of Graubünden
Tschiertschen-Praden